Gandar is a village situated in Chapra district of Bihar, India. The total population of this village is around 3000. This village is situated 15 km from Marhourah. It is 7 km east from Mashrak railway station on State Highway 73.
In this village, Dr. Birendra Ray was famous person of Gandar Who was no more in a road accident. Dr. Birendra Ray Institute of Medical Sciences (Brims Hospitals) a Multi speciality Hospital near this village. Brims Hospitals is Providing excellent Medical Services in remote rural areas. It is a kind of Medical Start up established on 10 August 2018 with moto of providing best medical services in rural areas of India where 75% of our country population are deprived from good medical Services.

References 

Villages in Saran district